Mumbai Bandra Terminus (station code: BDTS) also known as Vandre Terminus (in Marathi)is a railway terminus in Bandra from where trains bound for Northern India and Western India are scheduled regularly. It was built in the 1990s to decongest the main  station. It is one of the five railway terminus within Greater Mumbai. It is close to Bandra Kurla Complex, a commercially important part of Mumbai as well as Mumbai Airport.

Trains

The following trains start from Bandra Terminus railway station:

 19019/20 Bandra Terminus–Dehradun Express
 19003/04 Bandra Terminus–Bhusawal Khandesh Express
 15067/68 Bandra Terminus–Gorakhpur Express (via Barhni)
 19091/92  Bandra Terminus-Gorakhpur Humsafar Express
 22196/95 Bandra Terminus–Jhansi Bi Weekly Express
 22971/72 Bandra Terminus–Ramnagar Express
 22443/44 Bandra Terminus–Kanpur Central  Weekly Superfast Express
 22921/22 Bandra Terminus–Gorakhpur Antyodaya Express
 12935/36 Bandra Terminus–Surat Intercity Express
 12471/72 Bandra Terminus–Shri Mata Vaishno Devi Katra Swaraj Superfast Express
 22989/90 Bandra Terminus–Mahuva Superfast Express
 12925/26 Bandra Terminus–Amritsar Paschim Superfast Express
 22451/52 Bandra Terminus–Chandigarh Bi-Weekly Superfast Express
 19027/28 Bandra Terminus–Jammu Tawi Vivek Express
 12215/16 Bandra Terminus–Delhi Sarai Rohilla Garib Rath Express
 22949/50 Bandra Terminus–Delhi Sarai Rohilla Express
 22915/16 Bandra Terminus–Hisar Superfast Express
 20921/22 Bandra Terminus–Lucknow Weekly SF Express
 22913/14 Bandra Terminus–Saharsa Humsafar Express
 22917/18 Bandra Terminus–Haridwar Weekly SF Express
 12480/79 Bandra Terminus–Jodhpur Suryanagari Superfast Express
 22473/74 Bandra Terminus–Bikaner Superfast Express
 22931/32 Bandra Terminus–Jaisalmer Superfast Express
 22935/36 Bandra Terminus–Palitana Express
 22963/64 Bandra Terminus–Bhavnagar Terminus Weekly Superfast Express
 22993/94 Bandra Terminus–Mahuva Superfast Express
 12979/80 Bandra Terminus–Jaipur Tri-Weekly Superfast Express
 12995/96 Bandra Terminus–Udaipur Superfast Express
 22933/34 Bandra Terminus–Jaipur Weekly Superfast Express
 12909/10 Bandra Terminus–Hazrat Nizamuddin Garib Rath Express
 12907/08 Bandra Terminus–Hazrat Nizamuddin Maharashtra Sampark Kranti Express
 22971/72 Bandra Terminus–Patna Weekly Express
 12247/48 Bandra Terminus–Hazrat Nizamuddin Yuva Express
 19217/18 Bandra Terminus–Jamnagar Saurashtra Janta Express
 22955/56 Bandra Terminus–Bhuj AC Superfast Express
 22927/28 Bandra Terminus–Ahmedabad Lok Shakti Superfast Express
 19707/08 Bandra Terminus–Shriganganagar  Amrapur Aravali Express
 12971/72 Bandra Terminus–Bhavnagar Terminus Express
 20941/42 Bandra Terminus–Bhagat Ki Kothi Humsafar Express
 19037/38 Bandra Terminus–Gorakhpur Avadh Express
 22901/02 Bandra Terminus–Udaipur Superfast Express
 20941/42 Bandra Terminus–Ghazipur City Weekly Express
 22903/04 Bandra Terminus–Bhuj AC Superfast Express
 22965/66 Bandra Terminus–Bhagat Ki Kothi Express
 22951/52 Bandra Terminus–Gandhidham Weekly Superfast Express
 22923/24 Bandra Terminus–Jamnagar Humsafar Express

References 

Railway terminus in India
Bandra
Railway stations in Mumbai Suburban district
Mumbai WR railway division
Railway stations opened in 1992
1992 establishments in Maharashtra